Martin King may refer to:
Martin Luther King Jr. (1929–1968), Baptist minister and civil rights activist
Martin Luther King Sr. (1899–1984), Baptist minister and the father of Martin Luther King, Jr.
Martin Luther King III (born 1957), son of Martin Luther King, Jr. and a former head of the Southern Christian Leadership Conference
Dr. Martin King, fictional character in the TV series The Avengers
 Martin King (actor) (1933–2019), British actor and voice actor
 Martin King (inventor) (1950–2010), American co-inventor of T9
 Martin King, Australian former radio announcer on Melbourne Talk Radio 
 Martin King (broadcaster) (born 1963), Irish broadcaster with Virgin Media Television (Ireland)
 Martin King (author), British author, co-writer with Martin Knight
 Martin King (Eminence), businessman and director of Luton Town Football Club
 Admiral Martin King, abolition rebellion leader in the Danish West Indies